The 11021 / 11022 Dadar Terminus–Tirunelveli Chalukya Express is an express train of the Indian Railways connecting  in Tamil Nadu and Dadar Terminus of Mumbai, Maharashtra. It is currently being operated as 11021/11022 train numbers on tri-weekly basis.

History
This train gets its name from the Chalukya dynasty that ruled the Karnataka region. This train runs via the Karnataka region, following a Yeswanthpur–Hubli–Belgaum–Miraj route, giving a panoramic view of rural Karnataka.

The train covers the distance in 30 hrs 5 minutes. This route is longer and comprises certain ghats.

After 15 Oct 2012, it was extended up to Puducherry and Tirunelveli with tri-weekly days.

Route & Halts 

  
 
 
 
 
 
Maharashtra – Karnataka State Border
 
 
 
 
 
 
 
Karnataka – Tamil Nadu State Border

See also

 Dadar Central–Puducherry Chalukya Express
 Lokmanya Tilak Terminus–Ernakulam Duronto Express
 Mumbai–Nagercoil Express

Notes

References 

Express trains in India
Transport in Tirunelveli
Rail transport in Maharashtra
Rail transport in Karnataka
Rail transport in Tamil Nadu
Transport in Mumbai
Railway services introduced in 2012